KH Coder is an open source software for computer assisted qualitative data analysis, particularly quantitative content analysis and text mining. It can be also used for computational linguistics. It supports processing and etymological information of text in several languages, such as Japanese, English, French, German, Italian, Portuguese and Spanish. Specifically, it can contribute factual examination co-event system hub structure, computerized arranging guide, multidimensional scaling and comparative calculations.

It is well received by researchers worldwide and used in a large number of disciplines, including neuroscience, sociology, psychology, public health, media studies, education research and computer science. There are more than 500 English research papers listed in Google scholar. More than 3500 academic research papers were published that use KH Coder according to a list compiled by the author.

KH Coder has been reviewed as a user friendly tool "for identifying themes in large unstructured data sets, such as online reviews or open-ended customer feedback" and has been reviewed in comparison to WordStat.

Features
Its features include:
 on word-level: Searching, KWIC concordance, collocation statistics, and correspondence analysis. 
 on category-level: Development of categories or dictionaries, cross tabulation, and correspondence analysis.
 on word- and category-level: Frequency lists, multi-dimensional scaling, co-occurrence network, and hierarchical cluster analysis.
 on document-level: Searching, clustering, and Naive Bayes classifier

KH Coder allows for further search and statistical analysis functions using back-end tools such as Stanford POS Tagger, the natural language processing toolkit FreeLing, Snowball stemmer, MySQL and R.

Alternatives
  qdap (Windows, Linux, macOS) for quantitative analysis of qualitative transcripts and natural language processing.

See also
 Computer-assisted qualitative data analysis software

References

External links
 
 KH Coder Reference Manual
 Scholarly research using KH Coder

Free QDA software
Cross-platform free software
Free R (programming language) software
Science software for macOS
Science software for Linux